Eric J. Wittenberg (born March 26, 1961) is an American Civil War (Civil War) historian, author, lecturer, tour guide and battlefield preservationist. He is a practicing attorney in downtown Columbus, Ohio. His published works have focused especially on the Civil War cavalryman and the cavalry battles of the Civil War, with emphasis on the Army of the Potomac's Cavalry Corps. His first book, Gettysburg's Forgotten Cavalry Actions, was chosen as the best new work addressing the Battle of Gettysburg in 1998, winning the Robert E. Lee Civil War Roundtable of Central New Jersey's Bachelder-Coddington Award. The second edition of this book, published in 2011, won the U. S. Army Historical Foundation's Distinguished Writing Award for that year's best reprint. In 2015, his book The Devil's to Pay: John Buford at Gettysburg won the Gettysburg Civil War Roundtable's 2015 Book Award. He was a member of the Governor of Ohio’s Advisory Commission on the Sesquicentennial of the Civil War and has been active with several Civil War battlefield preservation organizations. He and his wife Susan Skilken Wittenberg reside on the east side of Columbus, Ohio.

Early life and education

Eric Wittenberg was born March 26, 1961 in Philadelphia, Pennsylvania. He earned an undergraduate degree in political science and economics from Dickinson College in Carlisle, Pennsylvania in 1983. Wittenberg earned both a master's degree in public and international affairs from the University of Pittsburgh Graduate School of Public and International Affairs and a Juris Doctor degree from the University of Pittsburgh School of Law in 1987.

Law practice 

Wittenberg has practiced law since 1987. His several areas of concentration include subjects related to his work as a historian, including internet law and media and publishing law, including copyright law. He is a partner in the Columbus, Ohio law firm of Cook, Sladoje & Wittenberg Co., L.P.A., where he manages the law firm's litigation practice.

Wittenberg is a member of various bar associations and the Westerville, Ohio Chamber of Commerce.

Battlefield preservation and civic work 

Wittenberg was a member of the Governor of Ohio’s Advisory Commission on the Sesquicentennial of the Civil War.

As of July 2016, Wittenberg is the vice president of the Buffington Island Battlefield Preservation Foundation.

His preservation efforts have included work with the Civil War Preservation Trust, the Trevilian Station Foundation, and Brandy Station Foundation. Due to his familiarity with and expertise concerning Civil War battles and battlefields, he has given lectures on the Civil War and has led battlefield tours. As of 2022, Wittenberg serves as a member of the board of the Central Virginia Battlefields Trust and as board chairman of the Little Big Horn Associates. He also serves as the program coordinator for the Chambersburg Civil War Seminars and Tours.

Books and articles 

"Gettysburg Magazine", "North & South", "Blue & Gray", "Hallowed Ground, America’s Civil War", and "Civil War Times Illustrated" have published over two dozen of Wittenberg's articles on cavalry in the American Civil War.

Wittenberg has been on the board of directors for North and South Magazine. He was a founding member and past president of the Central Ohio Civil War Roundtable.

Wittenberg is the author or co-author of the following books

 Mingus, Scott L. and Eric J. Wittenberg. “If We Are Striking for Pennsylvania”: The Army of Northern Virginia and the Army of the Potomac March to Gettysburg - Volume 1: June 3–21, 1863.  El Dorado Hills, CA: Savas Beatie, 2022. .
 Powell, David A. and Eric J. Wittenberg. Tullahoma: The Forgotten Campaign that changed the Civil War, June 23–July 4, 1863. El Dorado Hills, CA: Savas Beatie, 2020. .
 Wittenberg, Eric J. At Custer's Side: The Civil War Writings of James Harvey Kidd. Kent, OH: Kent State University Press, 2001. .
 Wittenberg, Eric J. The Battle of Brandy Station: North America's Largest Cavalry Battle. Charleston, SC: The History Press, 2010. .
 Wittenberg, Eric J. The Battle of Monroe's Crossroads and the Civil War's Final Campaign. El Dorado Hills, CA: Savas Beatie, 2006. .
 Wittenberg, Eric J. The Battle of White Sulphur Springs: Averell Fails to Secure West Virginia. Charleston, SC: The History Press, 2011. .
 Wittenberg, Eric J. The Devil's to Pay: John Buford at Gettysburg: A History and Walking Tour. El Dorado Hills, CA: Savas Beatie, 2014, 2015, 2018. .
 Wittenberg, Eric J. Five or Ten Minutes of Blind Confusion: The Battle of Aiken, South Carolina, February 11, 1865. Burlington, NC: Fox Run Publishing, 2018. .
 Wittenberg, Eric J. Gettysburg's Forgotten Cavalry Actions: Farnsworth's Charge, South Cavalry Field, and the Battle of Fairfield, July 3, 1863, revised and expanded edition. New York: Savas Beatie LLC, 2011. .
 Wittenberg, Eric J. Glory Enough For All: Sheridan's Second Raid and the Battle of Trevilian Station. Washington, DC: Brassey's, Inc., 2001. .
 Wittenberg, Eric J. Holding the Line on the River of Death: Union Mounted Forces at Chickamauga, September 18, 1863. El Dorado Hills, CA: Savas Beatie, 2018. .
 Wittenberg, Eric J. Like a Meteor Blazing Brightly: The short but controversial life of Colonel Ulric Dahlgren. Roseville, MN: Edinborough Press, 2009. .
 Wittenberg, Eric J. Little Phil: A Reassessment of the Civil War Leadership of Gen. Philip H. Sheridan. Washington, DC: Brassey's, 2002. .
 Wittenberg, Eric J. One of Custer's Wolverines: The Civil War Letters of Brevet Brigadier General James H. Kidd, 6th Michigan Cavalry. Kent, OH: Kent State University Press, 2000. .
 Wittenberg, Eric J. Protecting the Flank at Gettysburg: The Battles for Brinkerhoff's Ridge and East Cavalry Field, July 2–3, 1863. El Dorado Hills, CA: Savas Beatie LLC, 2013. Originally published as Protecting the Flanks: The Battles for Brinkerhoff's Ridge and East Cavalry Field, Battle of Gettysburg, July 2–3, 1863. Ironclad Publishing, 2002. .
 Wittenberg, Eric J. Rush's Lancers: The Sixth Pennsylvania Cavalry in the Civil War. Yardley, PA: Westholme, 2007. .
 Wittenberg, Eric J., Edmund A. Sargus Jr. and Penny Barrick. Seceding from Secession: The Civil War, Politics, and the Creation of West Virginia. El Dorado Hills, CA: Savas Beatie, 2020. .
 Wittenberg, Eric J. and Scott Mingus, Sr. The Second Battle of Winchester: The Confederate Victory that Opened the Door to Gettysburg. El Dorado Hills, CA: Savas Beatie LLC, 2016. .
 Wittenberg, Eric J. The Union Cavalry Comes of Age: Hartwood Church to Brandy Station, 1863. Dulles, Virginia: Potomac Books, Inc., 2003, 2017. .
 Wittenberg, Eric J. Under Custer's Command: The Civil War Journal of James Henry Avery (Memories of War). Washington, DC: Brassey's, 2000. . 
 Wittenberg, Eric J. We Have It Damn Hard Out Here": The Civil War Letters of Sergeant Thomas W. Smith, 6th Pennsylvania Cavalry . Kent, OH: Kent State University Press, 1999. .
 Wittenburg, Eric J. We Ride a Whirlwind: Sherman and Johnston at Bennett Place. Burlington, NC: Fox Run Publishing, LLC, 2017. .
 Wittenberg, Eric J. With Sheridan in the Final Campaign Against Lee. Baton Rouge, LA: Louisiana State University Press, 2002. .
 Wittenberg, Eric J., and Daniel T. Davis. Out Flew the Sabers: The Battle of Brandy Station, June 9, 1863. El Dorado Hills, CA: Savas Beatie LLC, 2016. .
 Wittenberg, Eric J., and J. David Petruzzi. Plenty of Blame to Go Around: Jeb Stuart's Controversial Ride to Gettysburg. New York: Savas Beatie, 2006. .
 Wittenberg, Eric J., J. David Petruzzi, and Michael F. Nugent. One Continuous Fight: The Retreat from Gettysburg and the Pursuit of Lee's Army of Northern Virginia, July 4–14, 1863. New York: Savas Beatie, 2008. .
 Wittenberg, Eric J. '"We Ride a Whirlwind": Sherman and Johnston at Bennett Place', Burlington, NC: Fox Run Publishing, 2017. . 

Wittenberg is the co-author with Michael Aubrecht  of YOU STINK! Major League Baseball's Terrible Teams and Pathetic Players. Kent, OH: Black Squirrel Books, 2012. .

Wittenberg has a blog devoted to the Civil War, "Rantings of a Civil War Historian."

His published works have focused on the Civil War cavalryman and the cavalry battles of the Civil War, especially on the Army of the Potomac’s Cavalry Corps. His first book, Gettysburg's Forgotten Cavalry Actions, won the Robert E. Lee Civil War Roundtable of Central New Jersey's Bachelder-Coddington Award as the best new work addressing the Battle of Gettysburg in 1998. The second edition won the Army Historical Foundation's Distinguished Writing Award, for Reprint, 2011. His book The Devil's to Pay: John Buford at Gettysburg'' won the Gettysburg Civil War Roundtable's 2015 Book Award.

Notes

References 

 About Eric Wittenberg. Retrieved July 8, 2016.
 . Retrieved July 8, 2016.
 Baseball book description. Retrieved July 8, 2016.
 Civil War Trust bio for June 2016 annual conference. Retrieved July 12, 2016.
 Emerging Civil War series bio. Retrieved July 8, 2016.
 Eric J. Wittenberg books page. Retrieved July 8, 2016.
 Wittenberg talk to Kansas City CWRT. Retrieved July 8, 2016.
 Eric J. Wittenberg biography page at Amazon.com Retrieved November 27, 2022.
 Ohio Sesquicentennial Advisory Committee members. Retrieved July 8, 2016.
 "Rantings of a Civil War Historian." Retrieved July 8, 2016.
 Savas Beatie Wittenberg profile. Retrieved July 8, 2016.
 Wittenberg Law Group. Retrieved July 8, 2016.
 Eric J. Wittenberg biography page at Amazon.com Retrieved November 27, 2022.

1961 births
Living people
Historians of the American Civil War
American military historians